Georg Trakl (3 February 1887 – 3 November 1914) was an Austrian poet and the brother of the pianist Grete Trakl. He is considered one of the most important Austrian Expressionists. He is perhaps best known for his poem "Grodek", which he wrote shortly before he died of a cocaine overdose.

Life and work
Trakl was born and lived the first 21 years of his life in Salzburg. His father, Tobias Trakl (11 June 1837, Ödenburg/Sopron – 1910), was a dealer of hardware from Hungary, while his mother, Maria Catharina Halik (17 May 1852, Wiener Neustadt – 1925), was a housewife of partly Czech descent; she was a drug addict and left the education to a French "gouvernante", who brought Trakl into contact with French language and literature at an early age. His sister Grete Trakl was a musical prodigy; with her he shared artistic endeavors.  Poems allude to an incestuous relationship between the two.

Trakl attended a Catholic elementary school, although his parents were Protestants. He matriculated in 1897 at the Salzburg Staatsgymnasium, where he had problems in Latin, Greek, and mathematics, for which he had to repeat one year and then leave without Matura. At age 13, Trakl began to write poetry.

After quitting high school, Trakl worked for a pharmacist for three years and decided to adopt pharmacy as a career; this facilitated access to drugs, such as morphine and cocaine. It was during this time that he experimented with playwriting, but his two short plays, All Souls' Day and Fata Morgana, were not successful. However, from May to December 1906, Trakl published four prose pieces in the feuilleton section of two Salzburg newspapers. All cover themes and settings found in his mature work. This is especially true of "Traumland" (Dreamland), in which a young man falls in love with a dying girl who is his cousin.

In 1908, Trakl moved to Vienna to study pharmacy, and became acquainted with some local artists who helped him publish some of his poems. Trakl's father died in 1910, soon before Trakl received his pharmacy certificate; thereafter, Trakl enlisted in the army for a year-long stint. His return to civilian life in Salzburg was unsuccessful and he re-enlisted, serving as a pharmacist at a hospital in Innsbruck. There he became acquainted with a group of avant-garde artists involved with the well-regarded literary journal Der Brenner, a journal that began the Kierkegaard revival in the German-speaking countries. Ludwig von Ficker, the editor of  Der Brenner (and son of the historian Julius von Ficker), became his patron; he regularly printed Trakl's work and endeavored to find him a publisher to produce a collection of poems. The result of these efforts was Gedichte (Poems), published by Kurt Wolff in Leipzig during the summer of 1913. Ficker also brought Trakl to the attention of Ludwig Wittgenstein, who anonymously provided him with a sizable stipend so that he could concentrate on his writing.

At the beginning of World War I, Trakl served in the Austro-Hungarian Army and was sent as a medical officer to attend soldiers on the Eastern Front. Trakl suffered frequent bouts of depression. On one such occasion during the Battle of Gródek (fought in autumn 1914 at Gródek, then in the Kingdom of Galicia and Lodomeria), Trakl had to steward the recovery of some ninety soldiers wounded in the fierce campaign against the Russians. He tried to shoot himself from the strain, but his comrades prevented him. Hospitalized at a military hospital in Kraków and observed closely, Trakl lapsed into worse depression and wrote to Ficker for advice. Ficker convinced him to communicate with Wittgenstein. Upon receiving Trakl's note, Wittgenstein travelled to the hospital, but found that Trakl had died of a cocaine overdose. Trakl was buried at Kraków's Rakowicki Cemetery on 6 November 1914, but on 7 October 1925, as a result of the efforts by Ficker, his remains were transferred to the municipal cemetery of Innsbruck-Mühlau (where they now repose next to Ficker's).

Themes and motifs
While Trakl's very earliest poems are more philosophical and do not deal as much with the real world, most of his poems are either set in the evening or have evening as a motif. Silence is also a frequent motif in Trakl's poetry, and his later poems often feature the silent dead, who are unable to express themselves.

Bibliography 
Selected titles
 Gedichte (Poems), 1913
 Sebastian im Traum (Sebastian in the Dream), 1915
 Der Herbst des Einsamen (The Autumn of The Lonely One), 1920
 Gesang des Abgeschiedenen (Song of the Departed), 1933

Literary works in English
 Decline: 12 Poems, trans. Michael Hamburger, Guido Morris / Latin Press, 1952
 Twenty Poems of George Trakl, trans. James Wright & Robert Bly, The Sixties Press, 1961
 Selected Poems, ed. Christopher Middleton, trans. Robert Grenier et al., Jonathan Cape, 1968
 Georg Trakl: Poems, trans. Lucia Getsi, Mundus Artium Press, 1973
 Georg Trakl: A Profile, ed. Frank Graziano, Logbridge-Rhodes, 1983
 Song of the West: Selected Poems, trans. Robert Firmage, North Point Press, 1988
 The Golden Goblet: Selected Poems of Georg Trakl, 1887–1914, trans. Jamshid Shirani & A. Maziar, Ibex Publishers, 1994
 Autumn Sonata: Selected Poems of Georg Trakl, trans. Daniel Simko, Asphodel Press, 1998
 Poems and Prose, Bilingual edition, trans. Alexander Stillmark, Libris, 2001
 Re-edition: Poems and Prose. A Bilingual Edition, Northwestern University Press, 2005
 To the Silenced: Selected Poems, trans. Will Stone, Arc Publications, 2006
 In an Abandoned Room: Selected Poems by Georg Trakl, trans. Daniele Pantano, Erbacce Press, 2008
 The Last Gold of Expired Stars: Complete Poems 1908 - 1914, trans. Jim Doss & Werner Schmitt, Loch Raven Press, 2011
 Song of the Departed: Selected Poems of George Trakl, trans. Robert Firmage, Copper Canyon Press, 2012
 "Uncommon Poems and Versions by Georg Trakl", trans. James Reidel, Mudlark No. 53, 2014
 Poems, trans. James Reidel, Seagull Books, 2015
 Sebastian Dreaming, trans. James Reidel, Seagull Books, 2016
 A Skeleton Plays Violin, trans. James Reidel, Seagull Books, 2017
 Autumnal Elegies: Complete Poetry, trans. Michael Jarvie, 2019
Surrender to Night: The Collected Poems of Georg Trakl, trans. Will Stone, Pushkin Collection 2019
Collected Poems, trans. James Reidel, Seagull Books 2019

Critical studies
 Richard Millington, Snow from Broken Eyes: Cocaine in the Lives and Works of Three Expressionist Poets, Peter Lang AG, 2012
 Richard Millington, The Gentle Apocalypse: Truth and Meaning in the Poetry of Georg Trakl, Camden House, 2020
 Hans Joachim Schliep, on the Table Bread and wine- poetry and Religion in the works of Georg Trakl, Lambert Academic Publishing (LAP), 2020,

Poetry of Trakl in music 
 Experimental black metal artist Jute Gyte uses the entirety of Trakl’s “Helian” on the (2021) album with the same name
 The band Dead Eyed Sleeper uses Trakl's poem Menschheit as lyrics to the song of the same name, on the 2016 album Gomorrh.
Paul Hindemith: Die Junge Magd - Sechs Gedichte von Georg Trakl für eine Altstimme mit Flöte, Klarinette und Streichquartett, opus 23 Nr.2
 6 Lieder nach Gedichten von Georg Trakl, Op. 14 by Anton Webern.
 Peter Maxwell Davies: Revelation and Fall, Monodrama for soprano and instrumental ensemble, 1966.
 Heinz Winbeck: Symphony No. 3 Grodek for alto, speaker, and orchestra (1988)
 Sebastian im Traum, 2004 orchestral composition by Hans Werner Henze based on Trakl's work.
 Russian composer David Tukhmanov wrote a triptych for mezzo-soprano and piano titled Dream of Sebastian, or Saint Night, which is based on the poems of Trakl. The first performance took place in 2007.
Kristalliner Schrei, a 2014 setting of three poems from Gedichte for mezzo-soprano and string quartet, by Henry Breneman Stewart
 Trakl Gedichte by Philippe Manoury published by Éditions Durand
 Wild Winter: Lament V by Thea Musgrave

Poetry of Trakl in dance 
 "Silence Spoken: ...quiet answers to dark questions", an intersemiotic translation of five poems by Trakl into dance, choreographed by Angela Kaiser, 2015.

Movies related to Georg Trakl 
 Tabu - Es ist die Seele ein Fremdes auf Erden (31 May 2012)

See also

 List of Austrian writers

References

Further reading 
 Lindenberger, Herbert. Georg Trakl. New York: Twayne, 1971.
 Sharp, Francis Michael. The Poet's Madness: A Reading of Georg Trakl. Ithaca: Cornell UP, 1981.

Online texts 
 Red Yucca – German Poetry in Translation (trans. Eric Plattner)
 Translation of Trakl Poem 
 Translations of Trakl on PoemHunter — PDF
 Twenty Poems, trans. by James Wright and Robert Bly — PDF file of a 1961 translation, listed in Bibliography
 The Complete Writings of Georg Trakl in English – translations by Wersch and Jim Doss
  Trakl texts set to music, translated by Bertram Kottmann

External links 

 Photos of the graves of Ludwig von Ficker (left) and Georg Trakl (right) at the cemetery of Innsbruck-Mühlau: Photo 1 , Photo 2

1887 births
1914 suicides
Writers from Salzburg
20th-century Austrian poets
Austro-Hungarian poets
Austro-Hungarian writers
Austrian male poets
Austrian World War I poets
Austro-Hungarian military personnel of World War I
Expressionist poets
German-language poets
Modernist poets
Drug-related suicides in Poland
Austrian people of Hungarian descent
Austrian people of Czech descent
20th-century Austrian male writers
Austro-Hungarian Army officers
Military personnel who committed suicide
1914 deaths